Kaimukkao is a Thai Muay Thai fighter.

Titles and accomplishments

 Professional Boxing Association of Thailand (PAT) 
 2015 Thailand 135 lbs Champion
 Rajadamnern Stadium
 2010 Rajadamnern Stadium 126 lbs Champion
 2011 Rajadamnern Stadium Fight of the Year (vs Saeksan Or. Kwanmuang)
 2011 Rajadamnern Stadium Fighter of the Year
 2012 Rajadamnern Stadium 130 lbs Champion
 2016 Rajadamnern Stadium 130 lbs Champion
World Boxing Council Muaythai
 2012 WBC Muay Thai World 130 lbs Champion

Fight record

|-  style="background:#fbb;"
| 2018-03-17 || Loss ||align=left| Nuenglanlek Jitmuangnon || Siam Omnoi Stadium || Bangkok, Thailand || KO (Elbow) || 3 || 
|- 
! style=background:white colspan=9 |
|-  style="background:#cfc;"
| 2018-02-08 || Win||align=left| Nuenglanlek Jitmuangnon ||  || Thailand || Decision || 5 || 3:00
|-  style="background:#fbb;"
| 2017-11-09 || Loss ||align=left| Nuenglanlek Jitmuangnon || Rajadamnern Stadium || Bangkok, Thailand || Decision || 5 || 3:00
|-  style="background:#fbb;"
| 2017-08-04 || Loss||align=left| Sangmanee Sor Tienpo || True4U MuaymanWansuk,Rangsit Stadium || Pathum Thani, Thailand || KO || 3 ||  
|-
! style=background:white colspan=9 |
|-  style="background:#fbb;"
| 2017-06-05|| Loss||align=left| Superlek Kiatmuu9 ||Rajadamnern Stadium || Bangkok, Thailand || KO (Right Upper Elbow) || 2 ||
|-  style="background:#fbb;"
| 2017-05-04 || Loss||align=left| Sangmanee Sor Tienpo || Rajadamnern Stadium || Bangkok, Thailand || Decision || 5 || 3:00
|-  style="background:#cfc;"
| 2017-04-06|| Win||align=left| Rodtang Jitmuangnon || Rajadamnern Stadium  || Bangkok, Thailand || Decision || 5 || 3:00
|-  style="background:#fbb;"
| 2017-02-02|| Loss||align=left| Phet Utong Or. Kwanmuang|| Rajadamnern Stadium || Bangkok, Thailand || KO ( Right Elbow)|| 2 ||
|-  style="background:#cfc;"
| 2016-12-22|| Win||align=left| Superball Tded99|| Rajadamnern Stadium || Bangkok, Thailand || KO (Right High Kick) || 4 ||
|-  style="background:#fbb;"
| 2016-11-14|| Loss||align=left| Muangthai PKSaenchaimuaythaigym ||  Rajadamnern Stadium || Bangkok, Thailand || KO (Left Upper Elbow) || 3 || 1:00
|-  style="background:#cfc;"
| 2016-09-30|| Win||align=left| Rodlek P.K. Saenchaimuaythaigym || Lumpinee Stadium || Bangkok, Thailand || Decision || 5 || 3:00
|-  style="background:#fbb;"
| 2016-08-11 || Loss||align=left| Yodlekpet Or. Pitisak || Rajadamnern Stadium || Bangkok, Thailand || KO (Left Low Kicks)|| 2 ||
|-  style="background:#cfc;"
| 2016-06-24 || Win||align=left|  Yodlekpet Or. Pitisak ||  Lumpinee Stadium || Bangkok, Thailand || Decision || 5 || 3:00
|-  style="background:#cfc;"
| 2016-05-09 || Win ||align=left| Kaewkangwan Prewayo    || Rajadamnern Stadium || Bangkok, Thailand || Decision || 5 || 3:00
|-
! style=background:white colspan=9 |
|-  style="background:#cfc;"
| 2016-04-07|| Win||align=left| Kwan Suanmisakawan || Rajadamnern Stadium || Bangkok, Thailand || Decision || 5 ||3:00
|-  style="background:#cfc;"
| 2016-02-17|| Win||align=left| Bangpleenoi Petchyindee Academy || Rajadamnern Stadium || Bangkok, Thailand || Decision || 5 ||3:00
|-  style="background:#cfc;"
| 2015-12-08|| Win||align=left| Bangpleenoi Petchyindee Academy || Lumpinee Stadium || Bangkok, Thailand || Decision || 5 ||3:00 
|-
! style=background:white colspan=9 |
|-  style="background:#fbb;"
| 2015-10-30 || Loss||align=left| Kwankhao Mor.Ratanabandit  || Toyota Marathon, Semi Final || Nakhon Ratchasima, Thailand || Decision || 3 || 3:00
|-  style="background:#cfc;"
| 2015-10-30 || Win ||align=left| Victor Makchaga || Toyota Marathon, Quarter Final || Nakhon Ratchasima, Thailand || Decision || 3 || 3:00
|-  style="background:#cfc;"
| 2015-10-11|| Win||align=left| Pet Moosapanmai || Rangsit Stadium || Pathum Thani, Thailand || KO || 3 ||
|-  style="background:#fbb;"
| 2015-09-06|| Loss ||align=left| Arunchai Kiatpataraphan  || Rangsit Stadium || Pathum Thani, Thailand || Decision || 5 ||3:00
|-  style="background:#fbb;"
| 2014-10-09|| Loss ||align=left| Superlek Kiatmuu9   || Rajadamnern Stadium || Bangkok, Thailand || KO (Right High Kick)|| 3 || 2:49
|-  style="background:#cfc;"
| 2014-08-13 || Win||align=left| Phonek Mor.Puwana|| Rajadamnern Stadium || Bangkok, Thailand || Decision || 5 || 3:00
|-  style="background:#fbb;"
| 2014-07-08 || Loss||align=left| Kwankhao Mor.Ratanabandit || Lumpinee Stadium || Bangkok, Thailand || Decision || 5 || 3:00
|-  style="background:#c5d2ea;"
| 2014-06-11 || Draw||align=left| Kwankhao Mor.Ratanabandit || Rajadamnern Stadium || Bangkok, Thailand || Decision || 5 || 3:00
|-  style="background:#fbb;"
| 2014-05-06 || Loss||align=left| Kwankhao Mor.Ratanabandit || Lumpinee Stadium || Bangkok, Thailand || Decision || 5 || 3:00
|-
! style=background:white colspan=9 |
|-  style="background:#cfc;"
| 2014-02-28 || Win||align=left| Pettawee Sor Kittichai || Lumpinee Stadium || Bangkok, Thailand || Decision || 5 || 3:00
|-  style="background:#cfc;"
| 2014-01-03 || Win||align=left| Phetmorakot Petchyindee Academy || Lumpinee Stadium || Bangkok, Thailand || Decision || 5 || 3:00
|-  style="background:#fbb;"
| 2013-10-11|| Loss ||align=left| Saeksan Or. Kwanmuang || Lumpinee Stadium || Bangkok, Thailand || KO (Left Elbow)|| 1 || 3:00
|-  style="background:#cfc;"
| 2013-09-04|| Win||align=left| Saksuriya Kaiyangadaogym || Rajadamnern Stadium || Bangkok, Thailand || Decision || 5 || 3:00
|-  style="background:#fbb;"
| 2013-07-12 || Loss||align=left| Petpanomrung Kiatmuu9    || Lumpinee Stadium || Bangkok, Thailand || Decision || 5 || 3:00
|-
|-
! style=background:white colspan=9 |
|-  style="background:#cfc;"
| 2013-06-03|| Win||align=left| Ausiewpor Sujibamikiew || Rajadamnern Stadium || Bangkok, Thailand || Decision || 5 || 3:00
|-  style="background:#cfc;"
| 2013-05-02|| Win||align=left| Ausiewpor Sujibamikiew || Rajadamnern Stadium || Bangkok, Thailand || Decision || 5 || 3:00
|-  style="background:#cfc;"
| 2013-03-25|| Win||align=left| Kiatphet Sunahanpeekmai|| Rajadamnern Stadium || Bangkok, Thailand || Decision || 5 || 3:00
|-  style="background:#fbb;"
| 2012-10-16 || Loss||align=left| Fahsang Sor.Chokitchai || Lumpinee Stadium || Bangkok, Thailand || Decision || 5 || 3:00
|-  style="background:#fbb;"
| 2012-09-12 || Loss||align=left| Singtongnoi Por.Telakun || Lumpinee Stadium || Bangkok, Thailand || TKO (Elbow)|| 3 ||
|-  style="background:#cfc;"
| 2012-07-05|| Win||align=left| Ekkarit Mor.Krungthepthonburee || Rajadamnern Stadium || Bangkok, Thailand || Decision || 5 || 3:00
|-
! style=background:white colspan=9 |
|- align="center"  bgcolor="#cfc"
| 2012-06-03 || Win||align=left| Shunta || Bigbang 9 || Tokyo, Japan || Decision (Unanimous) || 5 || 3:00

|-  style="background:#cfc;"
| 2012-04-17 || Win||align=left|  Lekkla Tanasuranakon   || Lumpinee Stadium || Bangkok, Thailand || Decision || 5 || 3:00
|-  style="background:#cfc;"
| 2012-03-26|| Win||align=left| Yuttachai Kiettipatphan  || Rajadamnern Stadium || Bangkok, Thailand || Decision || 5 || 3:00
|-  style="background:#fbb;"
| 2011-09-01 || Loss||align=left| Saeksan Or. Kwanmuang  || Rajadamnern Stadium || Bangkok, Thailand || KO (Straight Right)|| 2 || 1:10
|-  style="background:#cfc;"
| 2011-08-04|| Win||align=left| Ritidet Wor-Wantawee || Rajadamnern Stadium || Bangkok, Thailand || Decision || 5 || 3:00
|-  style="background:#fbb;"
| 2011-06-30|| Loss ||align=left| Ekkarit Mor Krungtheptonburee || Rajadamnern Stadium || Bangkok, Thailand || KO (high kick)|| 4 ||
|-  style="background:#cfc;"
| 2011-04-07|| Win ||align=left| Kongsiam Tor.Phittakachai|| Rajadamnern Stadium || Bangkok, Thailand || Decision || 5 || 3:00
|-  style="background:#cfc;"
| 2011-02-23|| Win ||align=left| Ekkarit Mor Krungtheptonburee|| Rajadamnern Stadium || Bangkok, Thailand || Decision || 5 || 3:00
|-  style="background:#fbb;"
| 2011-01-31|| Loss ||align=left| Kongsiam Tor.Phittakachai|| Rajadamnern Stadium || Bangkok, Thailand || Decision || 5 || 3:00
|-  style="background:#fbb;"
| 2010-12-16|| Loss||align=left| Phet-to Sitjaopho || Rajadamnern Stadium || Bangkok, Thailand || Decision || 5 || 3:00
|-  style="background:#fbb;"
| 2010-10-07|| Loss||align=left| Phet-ek Sitjaopho || Rajadamnern Stadium || Bangkok, Thailand || Decision || 5 || 3:00
|-  style="background:#fbb;"
| 2010-08-30|| Loss||align=left| Phet-ek Sitjaopho || Rajadamnern Stadium || Bangkok, Thailand || Decision || 5 || 3:00
|-  style="background:#cfc;"
| 2010-08-09|| Win||align=left| Kongsayarm Tor-Pitakchai || Rajadamnern Stadium || Bangkok, Thailand || Decision || 5 || 3:00
|-
! style=background:white colspan=9 |
|-  style="background:#cfc;"
| 2010-06-07|| Win||align=left| Kaenfang Por Pongchon || Rajadamnern Stadium || Bangkok, Thailand || Decision || 5 || 3:00
|-  style="background:#cfc;"
| 2010-05-15|| Win||align=left| Rittijak Kaewsamrit  || Omnoi Stadium || Samut Sakhon, Thailand || KO || 3 ||
|-  style="background:#cfc;"
| 2010-03-01|| Win||align=left| Kongsiam Tor.Phittakachai  || Rajadamnern Stadium || Bangkok, Thailand || KO || 4 ||
|-  style="background:#cfc;"
| 2010-02-01|| Win||align=left| Rambo Phetphokao|| Rajadamnern Stadium || Bangkok, Thailand || KO || 4 ||
|-  style="background:#cfc;"
| 2009-11-04|| Win||align=left| Dejsuriya Sitthiprasert || Rajadamnern Stadium || Bangkok, Thailand || Decision || 5 || 3:00
|-  style="background:#cfc;"
| 2009-09-10|| Win||align=left| Thongchai Tor. Silachai|| Rajadamnern Stadium || Bangkok, Thailand || Decision || 5 || 3:00
|-  style="background:#fbb;"
| 2009-05-23|| Loss||align=left| Kongsak P.K. Saenchaimuaythaigym|| Omnoi Stadium || Samut Sakhon, Thailand || KO (Elbow) || 4 || 3:00
|-  style="background:#fbb;"
| 2009-03-14|| Loss ||align=left| Petchdam Sitboonmee || Omnoi Stadium || Samut Sakhon, Thailand || KO || 4 ||
|-  style="background:#cfc;"
| 2009-02-14|| Win||align=left| Chaimongkol M16 || Omnoi Stadium || Samut Sakhon, Thailand || Decision || 5 || 3:00
|-  style="background:#fbb;"
| 2008-11-06|| Loss||align=left| Thongchai Tor. Silachai|| Rajadamnern Stadium || Bangkok, Thailand || Decision || 5 || 3:00

|-  style="background:#cfc;"
| 2008-09-13|| Win||align=left| Luknimit Singklongsi|| Onesongchai || Bangkok, Thailand || Decision  || 5 || 3:00
|-  style="background:#fbb;"
| 2008-07-10|| Loss||align=left| Luknimit Singklongsi|| Rajadamnern Stadium || Bangkok, Thailand || TKO  || 5 ||

|-  style="background:#cfc;"
| 2008-05-22|| Win||align=left| Thaweesak Singklongsi || Kiatyongyuth, Rajadamnern Stadium|| Bangkok, Thailand || Decision  || 5 || 3:00

|-  style="background:#cfc;"
| 2008-04-10|| Win||align=left| Daoden Singklongsi || Onesongchai, Rajadamnern Stadium|| Bangkok, Thailand || KO || 3|| 

|-  style="background:#cfc;"
| 2008-03-12|| Win||align=left| Thaweesak Singklongsi || Rajadamnern Stadium|| Bangkok, Thailand || Decision  || 5 || 3:00

|-  style="background:#cfc;"
| 2008-02-16|| Win||align=left| Wanmainoi Decharat || || Bangkok, Thailand || KO || 4 || 
|-
| colspan=9 | Legend:

References

Kaimukkao Por.Thairongruangkamai
Living people
1990 births
Kaimukkao Por.Thairongruangkamai